Robert Béliard (19 February 1912 – 7 October 1993) was a French racing cyclist. He rode in the 1936 Tour de France.

References

1912 births
1993 deaths
French male cyclists
Place of birth missing